Pulpit (February 15, 1994 – December 6, 2012) was an American Thoroughbred racehorse who won the Fountain of Youth Stakes and Blue Grass Stakes and came fourth in the 1997 Kentucky Derby. Injured after that race, he retired to stud at Claiborne Farm near Paris, Kentucky where he became a successful sire. His descendants include leading sire in North America Tapit and multiple American Classic winners such as Tonalist and California Chrome.

Background
Pulpit was bred in Kentucky by Claiborne Farm, who purchased his fifth dam, Knight's Daughter, in 1951. Knight's Daughter produced Hall of Fame inductee Round Table for Claiborne in 1954 and his full sister Monarchy in 1957. Monarchy founded a successful female family, most notably through the full sister's Preach and Yarn, both by Mr. Prospector out of Monarchy's granddaughter Narrate. Preach, herself a Grade I winner, produced twelve winners from fourteen foals. Her most successful offspring was Pulpit, whose sire was the 1992 American Horse of the Year A.P. Indy.

Racing career
Pulpit was unraced as a two-year-old. He made his first start in January 1997, and immediately made an impact by winning his first three starts, including the Grade 2 Fountain of Youth Stakes at Gulfstream Park in Florida.

After finishing second in the Grade 1 Florida Derby, Pulpit dominated his next start, the $700,000 Blue Grass Stakes at Keeneland Race Course in Kentucky. With Shane Sellers aboard, Pulpit drew clear down the stretch and finished 3 1/2 lengths in front of Acceptable. The race solidified his status as a legitimate Kentucky Derby contender.

Running in the 1997 Kentucky Derby, Pulpit finished fourth behind Silver Charm, Captain Bodgit and Free House. He suffered an injury to his left hind leg during the race and was retired to stud duty shortly thereafter.

Stud career
Much like his sire, A.P. Indy, Pulpit proved to be a very successful stallion. As of September 4, 2013, he had produced 861 foals of racing age, with 672 of those starting races and 470 winning. His foals have earned more than $60 million. Pulpit also has the distinction of being the grandsire of the 2014 Kentucky Oaks winner Untapable, 2014 Kentucky Derby and 2014 Preakness winner California Chrome and 2014 Belmont winner Tonalist.

Among his progeny are several graded stakes winners, including:
 Corinthian. Breeders' Cup Dirt Mile
 Essence of Dubai. UAE Derby
 Ice Box. Florida Derby
 Lucky Pulpit, sire of California Chrome
 Mr. Speaker. Belmont Derby
 Parading. Dixie Stakes
 Power Broker. FrontRunner Stakes
 Purge. Jim Dandy Stakes
 Pyro. Louisiana Derby
 Rutherienne. Del Mar Oaks
 Sightseeing. Peter Pan Stakes
 Sky Mesa. Hopeful Stakes
 Stroll. Woodford Reserve Turf Classic
 Tapit. Wood Memorial, sire of Hansen, Tonalist, Frosted and others. Leading sire in North America of 2014, 2015 and 2016

Pulpit died on December 6, 2012 at the age of 18 at Claiborne Farm. He had shown no signs of illness or injury prior to his death.

Pedigree

Pulpit stood at Claiborne Farm and is by A.P. Indy, the 1992 Horse of the Year and an outstanding sire. A.P. Indy is by Triple Crown winner Seattle Slew, and out of Weekend Surprise by Secretariat. Pulpit's female family traces back to one of Claiborne's foundation mares, Knight's Daughter, the dam of Round Table.

Pulpit is inbred 4 × 5 × 5 to Bold Ruler, 5 × 5 to Nasrullah, and 5 × 5 to Princequillo.

References

1994 racehorse births
2012 racehorse deaths
Racehorses bred in Kentucky
Racehorses trained in the United States
Thoroughbred family 2-f
Chefs-de-Race
United States Champion Thoroughbred Sires